Bernard Tyrone Bickerstaff (born February 11, 1944) is an American basketball coach and front office executive, currently serving as the Senior Basketball Advisor for the Cleveland Cavaliers. As a coach, he previously worked as the head coach for the NBA's Seattle SuperSonics, Denver Nuggets, Washington Bullets/Wizards, Charlotte Bobcats, and Los Angeles Lakers. He has also been an assistant for the Portland Trail Blazers, Chicago Bulls, Los Angeles Lakers, and Cavaliers. He has served in numerous other NBA front office positions, and has been a consultant for the Harlem Globetrotters.

Early years
Bickerstaff was born in Benham, Kentucky, where his father and grandfather worked in the coal mines. He often had to endure open racism. He attended East Benham High School, where he was the starting point guard of the basketball team. 

After graduating in 1961, Bickerstaff moved to Cleveland where he had relatives, with the idea of joining the Army, but he instead accepted a basketball scholarship to play for Rio Grande College. The racial tension he experienced during his time playing there made him leave school early and head back to Cleveland to work in a steel mill. However, the difficult working conditions prompted him to accept a second opportunity to play college basketball at the University of San Diego from 1964 to 1966. As a senior, he was named team captain and MVP, when the Toreros finished 17–11 and went on to play at the Small College Regional Playoffs. He is a member of the Kappa Alpha Psi fraternity.

Professional career
After finishing his college eligibility, Bickerstaff was hired by his coach Phil Woolpert to serve as an assistant for the 1968–69 season. After three seasons at 25 years old, he was named the head coach of the University of San Diego after Woolpert's abrupt resignation, keeping this position for the next four years. In 1972–1973 his team finished 19–9 and his four-year overall record was 54–49.

In 1973, Bickerstaff was hired as an assistant for the Washington Bullets by then coach K. C. Jones and was a part of the 1978 Bullets NBA Championship. He left the team after 12 seasons to become head coach of the Seattle SuperSonics. Lenny Wilkens, who had been elevated from coach to GM in 1985, hired Bickerstaff for the head coaching position to replace himself. Bickerstaff was head coach of the Sonics from 1985–1990, with the team reaching the Western Conference Finals in 1987.

Bickerstaff was the Denver Nuggets' president and general manager from 1990 to 1997, also coaching the team from 1994 to 1996.

In 1997, Wes Unseld hired Bickerstaff to coach the Bullets, making the playoffs for the first time since 1988 and becoming the league's all-time 34th-winningest coach. After parting ways with the team in 1999, he had a two-year stint with the International Basketball League's St. Louis Swarm. Bickerstaff was twice named IBL Coach of the Year.

In 2003, Bickerstaff was hired by Ed Tapscott to become the expansion Charlotte Bobcats' first head coach and general manager.

Bickerstaff was hired by the Los Angeles Lakers in 2012–13 as an assistant coach to Mike Brown. 
On November 9, 2012, Bickerstaff was named interim head coach of the Lakers after Brown was fired. Three days later, the Lakers signed former Knicks coach Mike D'Antoni as their official head coach, although D'Antoni's on-court debut was delayed as he recovered from knee-replacement surgery. Bickerstaff continued to coach the Lakers in D'Antoni's absence, ending his stint with a 4–1 record, the highest winning percentage in Lakers' history, albeit in only five games. He continued with the team as an assistant coach, but was fired after the season.

In the summer of 2013, Bickerstaff became an assistant coach with the Cleveland Cavaliers. The following year, he moved up to the Cavaliers' front office, serving as a senior advisor.  As a member of the Cavaliers front office, he was part of Cleveland's  2016 NBA Championship team.

Head coaching record

NBA

|- 
| align="left" |Seattle
| align="left" |
|82||31||51||.378|| align="center" |5th in Pacific||—||—||—||—
| align="center" |Missed Playoffs
|- 
| align="left" |Seattle
| align="left" |
|82||39||43||.476|| align="center" |4th in Pacific||14||7||7||.500
| align="center" |Lost in Conf. Finals
|- 
| align="left" |Seattle
| align="left" |
|82||44||38||.537|| align="center" |3rd in Pacific||5||2||3||.400
| align="center" |Lost in First Round
|- 
| align="left" |Seattle
| align="left" |
|82||47||35||.573|| align="center" |3rd in Pacific||8||3||5||.375
| align="center" |Lost in Conf. Semifinals
|- 
| align="left" |Seattle
| align="left" |
|82||41||41||.500|| align="center" |4th in Pacific||—||—||—||—
| align="center" |Missed Playoffs
|- 
| align="left" |Denver
| align="left" |
|32||20||12||.625|| align="center" |4th in Midwest||3||0||3||.000
| align="center" |Lost in First Round
|- 
| align="left" |Denver
| align="left" |
|82||35||47||.427|| align="center" |4th in Midwest||—||—||—||—
| align="center" |Missed Playoffs
|- 
| align="left" |Denver
| align="left" |
|13||4||9||.308|| align="center" |(fired)||—||—||—||—
| align="center" |Missed Playoffs
|- 
| align="left" |Washington
| align="left" |
|35||22||13||.628|| align="center" |4th in Atlantic||3||0||3||.000
| align="center" |Lost in First Round
|- 
| align="left" |Washington
| align="left" |
|82||42||40||.512|| align="center" |4th in Atlantic||—||—||—||—
| align="center" |Missed Playoffs
|- 
| align="left" |Washington
| align="left" |
|50||18||32||.360|| align="center" |6th in Atlantic||—||—||—||—
| align="center" |Missed Playoffs
|- 
| align="left" |Charlotte
| align="left" |
|82||18||64||.220|| align="center" |4th in Southeast||—||—||—||—
| align="center" |Missed Playoffs
|- 
| align="left" |Charlotte
| align="left" |
|82||26||56||.317|| align="center" |4th in Southeast||—||—||—||—
| align="center" |Missed Playoffs
|- 
| align="left" |Charlotte
| align="left" |
|82||33||49||.402|| align="center" |4th in Southeast||—||—||—||—
| align="center" |Missed Playoffs
|- 
| align="left" |L.A. Lakers
| align="left" |
|5||4||1||.800|| align="center" |(interim)||—||—||—||—
| align="center" |—
|-class="sortbottom"
| align="left" |Career
| ||937||419||518||.447|| ||33||12||21||.364

Awards and accolades
 In 1987, he received the Horace Mann Award for Leadership and was also named the 1987 Sports Person of the Year, presented by the New York Pro-Am Basketball Association. 
 In 1995, he was inducted into the University of San Diego's Hall of Fame. 
 Inducted into the West Coast Conference's inaugural Hall of Honor.
 In 2010, he was inducted into the John McClendon Minority Athletics Administrators Hall of Fame.
 In 2011, he was named a Kappa Legend and Icon in Sports.
 In 2012, he was inducted into the Breitbard Hall of Fame.
 His hometown of Benham, Kentucky, named a street – Bernard Bickerstaff Boulevard – in his honor.
 In 2014, he was awarded the NBA's Chuck Daly Lifetime Achievement Award.

Personal life
Bickerstaff also worked as a TV and radio analyst with the Washington Wizards, San Antonio Spurs, NBA.com and the Sporting News Radio. His son, J. B. Bickerstaff, is the current head coach for the Cleveland Cavaliers. His wife Eugenia is retired. He has two other sons, Bernard Jr.,and Tim. Also two Daughters Cydni and Robin..

References

External links

 BasketballReference.com: Bernie Bickerstaff
 NBA bio

1944 births
Living people
African-American basketball coaches
African-American basketball players
African-American sports executives and administrators
American men's basketball coaches
American men's basketball players
American sports executives and administrators
Basketball coaches from Kentucky
Basketball players from Kentucky
BSN coaches
Charlotte Bobcats head coaches
Charlotte Hornets executives
Chicago Bulls assistant coaches
Cleveland Cavaliers assistant coaches
Denver Nuggets head coaches
International Basketball League (1999–2001) coaches
Los Angeles Lakers assistant coaches
Los Angeles Lakers head coaches
National Basketball Association executives
People from Harlan County, Kentucky
Portland Trail Blazers assistant coaches
San Diego Toreros men's basketball coaches
San Diego Toreros men's basketball players
Seattle SuperSonics head coaches
University of Rio Grande alumni
Washington Bullets assistant coaches
Washington Bullets head coaches
Point guards
21st-century African-American people
20th-century African-American sportspeople